The Bucharest Nine or the Bucharest Format (B9 or B-9;) is an organization founded on 4 November 2015 in Bucharest, Romania, at the initiative of the President of Romania Klaus Iohannis and the President of Poland Andrzej Duda during a bilateral meeting between them. Its members are Bulgaria, the Czech Republic, Estonia, Hungary, Latvia, Lithuania, Poland, Romania and Slovakia. Its appearance was mainly a result of a perceived aggressive attitude from Russia following the annexation of Crimea from Ukraine and its posterior intervention in eastern Ukraine both in 2014. All members of the B9 were either part of the former Soviet Union (USSR) or members of the defunct Soviet-led Warsaw Pact.

History
Since its foundation on 4 November 2015, the Bucharest Nine countries have held several meetings at various levels. A tabular list follows the historical development.

In June 2018, prior to the B9 meeting that year, President of Poland Andrzej Duda spoke out in favour of Ukrainian and Georgian NATO membership ambitions.

On 10 May 2021, during a B9 video conference summit which the President of the United States Joe Biden joined, President of Romania Klaus Iohannis (one of the two hosts of the summit, the other being Duda) called for "stronger allied military presence [...] on the bloc's eastern flank" following the mobilization of Russian troops near the Russian border with Ukraine which had happened some time before.

On 25 February 2022, the B9 group with the addition of Ursula von der Leyen, President of the European Commission, gathered in light of the 2022 Russian invasion of Ukraine.

The 10 June 2022 B9 summit was attended virtually by the Secretary General of NATO, Jens Stoltenberg, as well as the presidents of the Czech Republic and Slovakia. On it, Duda declared "We want the enhanced forward presence that we have today on NATO's eastern flank to be extended. We want the existing battalion groups to be transformed into brigade groups." Duda added that a brigade group has 3,000 troops, which would mean a "significant and visible strengthening", while Iohannis said that "NATO must be capable to defend every inch of its territory". Iohannis added that the B9 summit agreed in favour of admitting Sweden and Finland into NATO and told participants of the meeting that "security risks to Romania and the Black Sea region are increasing", and in the press release it was written that the meeting was in order to prepare for the most important decisions of NATO's 2022 Madrid summit. Furthermore, the President of Estonia Alar Karis stated during the meeting that all nine members agree that Russia is a threat to NATO.

On 11 October 2022, the B9 presidents, along with the presidents of North Macedonia and Montenegro, condemned and demanded the end of that month's series of Russian missile strikes on Ukrainian civilian targets and described them as war crimes to be punished under international law.

On a 22 February 2023 summit, the heads of state of the Bucharest Nine countries, as well as Biden and Stoltenberg, signed a declaration which issued a condemnation of the Russian invasion of Ukraine and called for an enhanced military presence of NATO on the eastern flank of the alliance.

Summits of heads of state

Summits of ministers of foreign affairs

Summits of ministers of defence

See also
 European Union
 NATO
 Visegrád Group
 Group of Nine

References

Central Europe
Eastern Europe
European integration
Intergovernmental organizations
International political organizations
International security
International organizations based in Europe
Organizations related to NATO
Foreign relations of Bulgaria
Foreign relations of the Czech Republic
Foreign relations of Estonia
Foreign relations of Hungary
Foreign relations of Latvia
Foreign relations of Lithuania
Foreign relations of Poland
Foreign relations of Romania
Foreign relations of Slovakia
2015 establishments in Europe
2015 establishments in Romania
Bottom-up regional groups within the European Union